Emiliano Ariel Ozuna (born 9 February 1996) is an Argentine professional footballer who plays as a left midfielder for Celaya.

Career
Ozuna joined the Estudiantes youth ranks in 2009. Six years later, he made his professional debut for the club on 20 July 2015 in a victory away to Crucero del Norte. Two more appearances came Ozuna's way during 2015. After failing to feature for Estudiantes between 2016 and 2017, Ozuna departed in February 2017 to join fellow Primera División side Temperley on loan. His first league appearance for Temperley arrived on 12 March against Tigre, while his first goal came on 30 June versus Sportivo Las Parejas in the Copa Argentina. He returned to Estudiantes in July 2018, which preceded an immediate loan to Aldosivi.

On 27 June 2019, having mutually ended his contract with Estudiantes, Ozuna moved abroad to Ascenso MX outfit Celaya.

Career statistics
.

References

External links

1996 births
Living people
Sportspeople from Buenos Aires Province
Argentine footballers
Association football midfielders
Argentine expatriate footballers
Expatriate footballers in Mexico
Argentine expatriate sportspeople in Mexico
Argentine Primera División players
Estudiantes de La Plata footballers
Club Atlético Temperley footballers
Aldosivi footballers
Club Celaya footballers